Bayside is one of the seven original boroughs created with the city of Virginia Beach, Virginia and was formed in 1963. Bayside lies in northern Virginia Beach in the vicinity of the intersection of U.S. Route 13 and U.S. Route 60. To the west of Bayside is the Naval Amphibious Base Little Creek.

City government
Bayside is represented by City Council Member Delceno Miles.

References

Communities in Virginia Beach, Virginia
Unincorporated communities in Virginia
Boroughs of Virginia Beach, Virginia